Alone in IZ World is an album by the Hawaiian musician Israel Kamakawiwo'ole released in 2001, 4 years after his death in 1997. The album has charted on several of Billboard’s album charts.  These are:  
 Top Independent Albums (47 weeks on the chart between 2001 and 2003, peaking at #6)
 Top World Albums chart, peaking at number 1 (104 weeks on the chart between 2001 and 2003, peaking at #1)
 The Billboard 200 (5 weeks on the chart between 2001 and 2002 peaking at #135)
 Top Internet Albums (3 weeks on the chart in 2002)
The album has continued to be a top seller, charting in the top 5 of the year-end Top World Catalog Albums chart for the years 2006 (#2),  2007 (#3), and 2008 (#5).

Track listing 
 "Mona Lisa"
 "Kaleohano"
 "ʻŪlili Ē"
 "Hanohano Wale Nō Nā Cowboy and Ka Huila Wai"
 "Hiʻilawe"
 "Henehene Kou ʻAka"
 "Ahi Wela/Twinkle Twinkle Little Star" (medley of 19th century Hawaii traditional song "Ahi Wela" and "Twinkle Twinkle Little Star")
 "ʻŌpae E"
 "Starting All Over Again"
 "Over the Rainbow"
 "Panini Pua Kea"
 "Lā ʻElima"
 "In This Life"
 "Iz Talks About Oxygen"

Certifications

References 

Israel Kamakawiwoʻole albums
2001 compilation albums
Compilation albums published posthumously